Vikas Mishra (born 27 December 1992) is an Indian first-class cricketer. He was also a member of Indian Premier League team Delhi Daredevils. Vikas was also a part of 15 member Indian squad to 2012 ICC Under-19 Cricket World Cup.

In July 2018, he was named in the squad for India Green for the 2018–19 Duleep Trophy. He was the leading wicket-taker for Delhi in the 2018–19 Ranji Trophy, with 33 dismissals in seven matches.

References

Living people
1992 births
Delhi cricketers
Delhi Capitals cricketers
Indian cricketers
India Green cricketers
North Zone cricketers